Nikos Papanikou (born 5 January 1992) is a Greek professional footballer who plays as a right-back for Super League 2 club Karaiskakis.

References

1992 births
Living people
Greek footballers
Gamma Ethniki players
Football League (Greece) players
Super League Greece 2 players
Thrasyvoulos F.C. players
A.E. Karaiskakis F.C. players
Association football defenders
Footballers from Arta, Greece